Putative ribosomal RNA methyltransferase 1 is an enzyme that in humans is encoded by the FTSJ1 gene.

The protein encoded by this gene is a member of the S-adenosylmethionine-binding protein family. It is a nucleolar protein and may be involved in the processing and modification of rRNA. Three alternatively spliced transcript variants encoding different isoforms have been described for this gene.

References

Further reading